Josef Bauer may refer to:

 Josef Bauer (politician) (1915–1989), German politician of the Christian Social Union of Bavaria
 Josef Bauer (SS officer) (1881–1958), German politician, Nazi Party member and SS officer
 Josef Bauer (artist) (1934–2022), Austrian artist